Bilal Tabur (born 1 January 1949) is a Turkish wrestler. He competed in the men's Greco-Roman 52 kg at the 1976 Summer Olympics.

References

External links
 

1949 births
Living people
Turkish male sport wrestlers
Olympic wrestlers of Turkey
Wrestlers at the 1976 Summer Olympics
Place of birth missing (living people)
World Wrestling Championships medalists